English alternative dance band Saint Etienne have released ten studio albums, two soundtrack albums, nine compilation albums, two remix albums, seven mix albums, two video albums, one box set, four extended plays, 38 singles (including one as a featured artist), and five promotional singles.

Albums

Studio albums

Soundtrack albums

Compilation albums

Remix albums

Mix albums

Video albums

Box sets

Extended plays

Singles

As lead artist

As featured artist

Promotional singles

Other charted songs

Fan club releases

Albums

Extended plays

Singles

Guest appearances

Remixes

Notes

References

External links
 
 SaintEtienneDisco.com Saint Etienne Discography and News Page
 
 
 

Discographies of British artists
Electronic music discographies
Pop music group discographies